The Guti, also known by the derived exonyms Gutians or Guteans, were a people of the ancient Near East. Their homeland was known as Gutium (Sumerian: ,Gu-tu-umki or ,Gu-ti-umki).

Conflict between people from Gutium and the Akkadian Empire has been linked to the collapse of the empire, towards the end of the 3rd millennium BC. The Guti subsequently overran southern Mesopotamia and formed the Gutian dynasty of Sumer. The Sumerian king list suggests that the Guti ruled over Sumer for several generations following the fall of the Akkadian Empire.

By the 1st millennium BC, usage of the name Gutium, by the peoples of lowland Mesopotamia, had expanded to include all of western Media, between the Zagros and the Tigris. Various tribes and places to the east and northeast were often referred to as Gutians or Gutium. For example, Assyrian royal annals use the term Gutians in relation to populations known to have been Medes or Mannaeans. As late as the reign of Cyrus the Great of Persia, the famous general Gubaru (Gobryas) was described as the "governor of Gutium".

Origin 

Little is known of the origins, material culture or language of the Guti, as contemporary sources provide few details and no artifacts have been positively identified. As the Gutian language lacks a text corpus, apart from some proper names, its similarities to other languages are impossible to verify. The names of Gutian kings suggest that the language was not closely related to any languages of the region, including Sumerian, Akkadian, Hurrian, Hittite, and Elamite. Most scholars reject the attempt to link Gutian king names to Indo-European languages.

History

25th to 23rd centuries BC 

The Guti appear in texts from Old Babylonian copies of inscriptions ascribed to Lugal-Anne-Mundu (fl. circa 25th century BC) of Adab as among the nations providing his empire tribute. These inscriptions locate them between Subartu in the north, and Marhashe and Elam in the south.

Sargon the Great (r. circa 2340 – 2284 BC) also mentions them among his subject lands, listing them between Lullubi, Armanum and Akkad to the north; Nikku and Der to the south. According to one stele, Naram-Sin of Akkad's army of 360,000 soldiers defeated the Gutian king Gula'an, despite having 90,000 slain by the Gutians.

The epic Cuthean Legend of Naram-Sin claims Gutium among the lands raided by Annubanini of Lulubum during the reign of Naram-Sin (c. 2254–2218 BC). Contemporary year-names for Shar-kali-sharri of Akkad indicate that in one unknown year of his reign, Shar-kali-sharri captured Sharlag king of Gutium, while in another year, "the yoke was imposed on Gutium".

Prominence during the early 22nd century BC 

During the Akkadian Empire period the Gutians slowly grew in strength and then established a capital at the Early Dynastic city of Adab. The Gutians eventually overran Akkad, and as the King List tells us, their army also subdued Uruk for hegemony of Sumer, in about 2147–2050 BC. However, it seems that autonomous rulers soon arose again in a number of city-states, notably Gudea of Lagash.

The Gutians seem also to have briefly overrun Elam at around the same time, towards the close of Kutik-Inshushinak's reign (c. 2100 BC). On a statue of the Gutian king Erridupizir at Nippur, an inscription imitates his Akkadian predecessors, styling him "King of Gutium, King of the Four Quarters".

The Weidner Chronicle (written c. 500 BC), portrays the Gutian kings as uncultured and uncouth:
{{blockquote|Naram-Sin destroyed the people of Babylon, so twice Marduk summoned the forces of Gutium against him. Marduk gave his kingship to the Gutian force. The Gutians were unhappy people unaware how to revere the gods, ignorant of the right cultic practices.Utu-hengal, the fisherman, caught a fish at the edge of the sea for an offering. That fish should not be offered to another god until it had been offered to Marduk, but the Gutians took the boiled fish from his hand before it was offered, so by his august command, Marduk removed the Gutian force from the rule of his land and gave it to Utu-hengal.}}

 Decline from the late 22nd century BC onwards 

The Sumerian ruler Utu-hengal, Prince of the Sumerian city of Uruk is similarly credited on the King List with defeating the Gutian ruler Tirigan, and removing the Guti from the country in circa 2050 BC (short chronology).

In his Victory Stele, Utu-hengal wrote about the Gutians:

Following this, Ur-Nammu of Ur ordered the destruction of Gutium. The year 11 of king Ur-Nammu also mentions "Year Gutium was destroyed". However, according to a Sumerian epic, Ur-Nammu died in battle with the Gutians, after having been abandoned by his own army.

A Babylonian text from the early 2nd millennium refers to the Guti as having a "human face, dogs’ cunning, [and] monkey's build".
Biblical scholars believe that the Guti may be the "Koa" (qôa''), named with the Shoa and Pekod as enemies of Jerusalem in Ezekiel 23:23, which was probably written in the 6th century BC.

Modern connection theories 
The historical Guti have been regarded by several scholars as having contributed to the ethnogenesis of the Kurds.

References 

 
States and territories established in the 3rd millennium BC
States and territories disestablished in the 3rd millennium BC
Ancient Mesopotamia
Ancient history of Iran
Former kingdoms